Roberto Buccione (born 8 August 1951) is a former Italian racewalker who competed at the 1976 Summer Olympics.

References

External links
 

1951 births
Athletes (track and field) at the 1976 Summer Olympics
Italian male racewalkers
Olympic athletes of Italy
Living people
20th-century Italian people